The Koepelgevangenis is a former prison in Breda, Netherlands, constructed in 1886, best known as the prison where convicted World War II collaborators and Nazi war criminals were housed.

History
The Koepelgevangenis was built from 1882 to 1886, having been designed by Johan Frederik Metzelaar, who also designed a similar prison at Arnhem. The prison was constructed as a panopticon, as invented in 1791 by Jeremy Bentham. This allowed the guards to continuously watch the prisoners from the centre of the building.

The Koepelgevangenis complex was designated a national monument in 2001 and housed a women's prison until 2013. The women were transferred to the Ter Peel institution in Horst aan de Maas. In that year, it was announced that the entire prison would be closed due to budget cutbacks. The first department was closed in 2014, and the entire complex closed its doors at the start of 2016.
As of 2018, the building is now used for events.

Since March 11, 2022, the location has been adjusted to become a semi-permanent living space for approximately 370 refugees, following the Ukraine-Russia conflict.

Layout
The complex consists of:
 fortified gate
 separate church building
 a jail and the former Breda court building, designed by Willem Cornelis Metzelaar, son of Koepelgevangenis designer Johan Frederik Metzelaar.
 the Koepelgevangenis itself

See also
Koepelgevangenis (Arnhem), also designed by Johan Frederik Metzelaar
Koepelgevangenis (Haarlem), designed by Willem Cornelis Metzelaar

References

External links
De Koepel gevangenis: cellengebouw (koepel) in Breda at rijksmonumenten.nl (in Dutch)

Prisons in the Netherlands
Buildings and structures in Breda
History of Breda
Rijksmonuments in North Brabant